Xyroptila sybylla is a moth of the family Pterophoridae. It is found in Peru (Cuzco).

References

External links

Moths described in 2006
Endemic fauna of Peru
Moths of South America
sybylla